Hartevatnet or Hartevatn is a lake in the municipality of Bykle in Agder county, Norway. It is located along the river Otra, on the south side of the village of Hovden. The lake is a good fishing spot and contains many brown trout. The Norwegian National Road 9 runs along the eastern shore of the lake.

The lake is a man-made reservoir. It was formed by the building of a hydro-electric dam on the river Otra. It is also connected to the nearby lake Breivevatnet by a canal.

See also
List of lakes in Aust-Agder
List of lakes in Norway

References

Lakes of Agder
Setesdal
Bykle
Reservoirs in Norway